The Mobb (stylized as The MOBB) is the debut album by South Korean hip-hop duo MOBB. The album was released online on September 8, 2016, and physically on September 23, 2016, by YG Entertainment. The album consists of two songs from the duo ("Hit Me" and "Full House"), Mino's solo song "Body", and Bobby's solo song "HOLUP!". The physical edition adds two bonus songs, "Fear" (MINO solo) and "가드올리고 Bounce" (Bobby solo).

Promotion
The music video for Bobby's solo track "꽐라 (HOLUP!)" was released on September 7, 2016, and the music video for Mino's solo track "몸 (BODY)" was released on September 8. On September 9, music videos for the collaborative singles "붐벼 (FULL HOUSE)" and "빨리 전화해 (HIT ME)" were released. The duo performed their songs "Hit Me" & "Full House" at Inkigayo on September 11, 2016. The duo also performed their solo song at M Countdown (aired September 22, 2016). On September 28 they performed "Hit Me" and "Full House" at a busking on a park in Hongdae, Seoul.

Commercial performance
Upon its release, the album debuted at number one on the Billboard World Albums chart. The album reached number two on South Korean Gaon Album Chart on the first week of physical release and number 6 on monthly chart (September). The album sold 31,744 copies in September. In Japan the album charted in Oricon album chart at No. 47, selling 1,418 copies. On December 28, 2016, the Japanese version of the album was released as their Japanese debut, with Japanese lyrics of three songs, "Full House", "HOLUP!" & "Body". The album charted in number seven selling 7,938 copies.

"Hit Me" debut at number 3 on Billboards World Digital Songs for the week October 1, 2016.  The MVs also had great reception where they land on number 2 (HOLUP!), 3 (Body), 6 (Full House) and 7 (Hit Me) for most watched K-Pop MVs (September 2016) in America and rank at 3 (HOLUP!), 5 (Body), 7 (Hit Me) and 8 (Full House) in the world.

Track listing

Charts

Sales

Release history

References

2016 debut albums
YG Entertainment albums
MOBB albums